The 1973 Rothmans Canadian Open – Men's doubles was an event of the 1973 Rothmans Canadian Open tennis tournament that was played at the Toronto Lawn Tennis Club in Toronto in Canada rom August 20 through August 26, 1973. The draw comprised 32 teams of which four were seeded. Ilie Năstase and Ion Ţiriac were the defending champion but did not participate in this edition. Third-seeded Rod Laver and Ken Rosewall won the doubles title, defeating unseeded Owen Davidson and John Newcombe in the final, 7–5, 7–6.

Seeds

Draw

Finals

Top half

Bottom half

References

External links
 ITF tournament edition details

Rothmans Canadian Open
1973 Grand Prix (tennis)